The Ministry of Tourism is the government department in charge of tourism in Greece. Established in 1989 and known between 2004 and 2009 as the Ministry of Touristic Development, it was merged with the Ministry of Culture in October 2009 but re-established as a separate department in June 2012. It was subsequently subsumed under the Ministry of the Economy, Infrastructure, Shipping and Tourism between January and September 2015 and the restructured Ministry of the Economy, Development and Tourism in September 2015, before being restored as a distinct ministry on 5 November 2016. The incumbent minister is Vasilis Kikilias of New Democracy.

Ministers for Touristic Development (2004–2009)

Minister for Tourism (2012–2015)

Alternate Ministers for Tourism (2015–2016)

Ministers for Tourism (since November 2016)

See also
 Cabinet of Greece
 Greek National Tourism Organisation
 Tourism in Greece

External links

 

Tourism
Tourism
Greece
Tourism in Greece